Keion Lee Brooks Jr. (born August 7, 2000) is an American college basketball player for the Washington Huskies of the Pac-12 Conference. He previously played for the Kentucky Wildcats.

High school career
Brooks played basketball for North Side High School in Fort Wayne, Indiana. As a sophomore, he averaged 20.5 points and 7.4 rebounds per game, leading his team to the Class 4A state title game. For his senior season, Brooks transferred to La Lumiere School in La Porte, Indiana. He played alongside Isaiah Stewart and helped his team to a GEICO Nationals runner-up finish. As a senior, Brooks averaged 20.1 points and 7.5 rebounds per game. He was selected to play in the Jordan Brand Classic.

Recruiting
Brooks was considered a five-star recruit by Rivals and 247Sports, and a four-star recruit by ESPN. On March 15, 2019, he committed to playing college basketball for Kentucky over offers from Indiana, Michigan State and North Carolina.

College career

Kentucky
As a freshman at Kentucky, Brooks averaged 4.5 points and 3.2 rebounds per game. He missed the first nine games of his sophomore season with a leg injury. On February 6, 2021, Brooks posted a season-high 23 points and 11 rebounds in an 82–71 loss to Tennessee. As a sophomore, he averaged 10.3 points, 6.8 rebounds and 1.6 assists per game. On January 29, 2022, Brooks scored a career-high 27 points in a 80–62 victory against Kansas. As a junior, he averaged 10.8 points and 4.4 rebounds per game. On April 4, 2022, Brooks declared for the 2022 NBA draft while maintaining his college eligibility.

Washington
Instead of returning to Kentucky, Brooks decided to enter the transfer portal. On June 6, 2022, Brooks committed to the University of Washington.

Career statistics

College

|-
| style="text-align:left;"| 2019–20
| style="text-align:left;"| Kentucky
| 31 || 6 || 15.1 || .472 || .263 || .630 || 3.2 || .2 || .4 || .4 || 4.5
|-
| style="text-align:left;"| 2020–21
| style="text-align:left;"| Kentucky
| 16 || 3 || 23.6 || .441 || .214 || .795 || 6.8 || 1.6 || .6 || .8 || 10.3
|-
| style="text-align:left;"| 2021–22
| style="text-align:left;"| Kentucky
| 33 || 33 || 24.5 || .491 || .233 || .783 || 4.4 || 1.0 || .7 || .6 || 10.8
|- class="sortbottom"
| style="text-align:center;" colspan="2"| Career
| 80 || 42 || 20.7 || .474 || .234 || .759 || 4.4 || .8 || .6 || .6 || 8.3

Personal life
Brooks' father, Keion Sr., played college basketball for Wright State. Brooks has served on the National Association of Basketball Coaches Player Development Coalition, as well as the Southeastern Conference Leadership Council and Council on Racial Equity and Social Justice.

References

External links
Washington Huskies bio
Kentucky Wildcats bio
USA Basketball bio

2000 births
Living people
American men's basketball players
Basketball players from Fort Wayne, Indiana
La Lumiere School alumni
Small forwards
Power forwards (basketball)
Kentucky Wildcats men's basketball players